Javier Rogelio Jáuregui Delgadillo (September 5, 1973 – December 11, 2013), also known as El Chatito, was a Mexican professional boxer in the lightweight (135 lb) division.

Jáuregui was born on 5 September 1973 (in Guadalajara, Jalisco) and turned pro in 1988 at the age of 14. After 15 years, in 2003, he captured the Vacant IBF Lightweight Title with a TKO over Leavander Johnson. He lost the title in his first defense to Julio Díaz in 2004.  He also handed future 2x lightweight world champion Jose Luis Castillo two TKO defeats.

Death
It was reported on December 11, 2013, that Jauregui had suffered a stroke in Jalisco, Mexico, and been declared braindead. He died later that day, after a short period in a coma.

Professional boxing record 

| style="text-align:center;" colspan="8" | 54 Wins (37 knockouts), 17 Losses (5 knockouts), 2 Draws
|-  style="text-align:center; background:#e3e3e3;"
|  style="border-style:none none solid solid;" | Res.
|  style="border-style:none none solid solid;" | Record
|  style="border-style:none none solid solid;" | Opponent
|  style="border-style:none none solid solid;" | Type
|  style="border-style:none none solid solid;" | Round
|  style="border-style:none none solid solid;" | Date
|  style="border-style:none none solid solid;" | Location
|  style="border-style:none none solid solid;" | Notes
|- align=center
| Win
| 54-17-2
| align=left |  Fernando Ayala
| 
| 
| 
| align=left | 
| align=left | 
|- align=center
| Loss
| 53-17-2
| align=left |  Ruslan Provodnikov
| 
| 
| 
| align=left | 
| align=left | 
|- align=center
| Loss
| 53-16-2
| align=left |  Almazbek Raiymkulov
| 
| 
| 
| align=left | 
| align=left | 
|- align=center
| Loss
| 53-15-2
| align=left |  Anthony Peterson
| 
| 
| 
| align=left | 
| align=left | 
|- align=center
| Win
| 53-14-2
| align=left |  Miguel Angel Huerta
| 
| 
| 
| align=left | 
| align=left | 
|- align=center
| Win
| 52-14-2
| align=left |  Adrian Mora
| 
| 
| 
| align=left | 
| align=left | 
|- align=center
| Loss
| 51-14-2
| align=left |  Jose Reyes
| 
| 
| 
| align=left | 
| align=left | 
|- align=center
| Loss
| 51-13-2
| align=left |  Joan Guzman
| 
| 
| 
| align=left | 
| align=left | 
|- align=center
| Win
| 51-12-2
| align=left |  Jose Quintana
| 
| 
| 
| align=left | 
| align=left | 
|- align=center
| Win
| 50-12-2
| align=left |  Randy Suico
| 
| 
| 
| align=left | 
| align=left | 
|- align=center
| Loss
| 49-12-2
| align=left |  Ricky Quiles
| 
| 
| 
| align=left | 
| align=left | 
|- align=center
| Win
| 49-11-2
| align=left |  Cristian Favela
| 
| 
| 
| align=left | 
| align=left | 
|- align=center
| Win
| 48-11-2
| align=left |  James Crayton
| 
| 
| 
| align=left | 
| align=left | 
|- align=center
| Loss
| 47-11-2
| align=left |  Julio Díaz
| 
| 
| 
| align=left | 
| align=left | 
|- align=center
| Win
| 47-10-2
| align=left |  Leavander Johnson
| 
| 
| 
| align=left | 
| align=left | 
|- align=center
| Win
| 46-10-2
| align=left |  Juan Gomez
| 
| 
| 
| align=left | 
| align=left | 
|- align=center
| Win
| 45-10-2
| align=left |  Alex Trujillo
| 
| 
| 
| align=left | 
| align=left | 
|- align=center
| Win
| 44-10-2
| align=left |  Miguel Casillas
| 
| 
| 
| align=left | 
| align=left | 
|- align=center
| Draw
| 43-10-2
| align=left |  Ryuhei Sugita
| 
| 
| 
| align=left | 
| align=left | 
|- align=center
| Loss
| 43-10-1
| align=left |  Miguel Casillas
| 
| 
| 
| align=left | 
| align=left | 
|- align=center
| Win
| 43-9-1
| align=left |  Ivan Valle
| 
| 
| 
| align=left | 
| align=left | 
|- align=center
| Win
| 42-9-1
| align=left |  Alex Camarillo
| 
| 
| 
| align=left | 
| align=left | 
|- align=center
| Loss
| 41-9-1
| align=left |  Acelino Freitas
| 
| 
| 
| align=left | 
| align=left | 
|- align=center
| Win
| 41-8-1
| align=left |  Jose Badillo
| 
| 
| 
| align=left | 
| align=left | 
|- align=center
| Win
| 40-8-1
| align=left |  Ricardo Rivera
| 
| 
| 
| align=left | 
| align=left | 
|- align=center
| Win
| 39-8-1
| align=left |  Adan Casillas
| 
| 
| 
| align=left | 
| align=left | 
|- align=center
| Loss
| 38-8-1
| align=left |  Agapito Sanchez
| 
| 
| 
| align=left | 
| align=left | 
|- align=center
| Win
| 38-7-1
| align=left |  Javier Leon
| 
| 
| 
| align=left | 
| align=left | 
|- align=center
| Loss
| 37-7-1
| align=left |  Rafael Olvera
| 
| 
| 
| align=left | 
| align=left | 
|- align=center
| Win
| 37-6-1
| align=left |  Alvaro Medel
| 
| 
| 
| align=left | 
| align=left | 
|- align=center
| Win
| 36-6-1
| align=left |  Julio Sanchez Leon
| 
| 
| 
| align=left | 
| align=left | 
|- align=center
| Loss
| 35-6-1
| align=left |  Jesus Chavez
| 
| 
| 
| align=left | 
| align=left | 
|- align=center
| Win
| 35-5-1
| align=left |  Jose Luis Castillo
| 
| 
| 
| align=left | 
| align=left | 
|- align=center
| Win
| 34-5-1
| align=left |  Benito Rodriguez
| 
| 
| 
| align=left | 
| align=left | 
|- align=center
| Win
| 33-5-1
| align=left |  Ismael Lopez
| 
| 
| 
| align=left | 
| align=left | 
|- align=center
| Win
| 32-5-1
| align=left |  Alvaro Medel
| 
| 
| 
| align=left | 
| align=left | 
|- align=center
| Win
| 31-5-1
| align=left |  Raul Martinez Mora
| 
| 
| 
| align=left | 
| align=left | 
|- align=center
| Win
| 30-5-1
| align=left |  Jose Luis Castillo
| 
| 
| 
| align=left | 
| align=left | 
|- align=center
| Win
| 29-5-1
| align=left |  Jose Luis Montes
| 
| 
| 
| align=left | 
| align=left | 
|- align=center
| Win
| 28-5-1
| align=left |  Elias Quiroz
| 
| 
| 
| align=left | 
| align=left | 
|- align=center
| Win
| 27-5-1
| align=left |  Antonio Hernandez
| 
| 
| 
| align=left | 
| align=left | 
|- align=center
| Win
| 26-5-1
| align=left |  Jose Rodriguez
| 
| 
| 
| align=left | 
| align=left | 
|- align=center
| Win
| 25-5-1
| align=left |  Rafael Ortega
| 
| 
| 
| align=left | 
| align=left | 
|- align=center
| Win
| 24-5-1
| align=left |  Roberto Avila
| 
| 
| 
| align=left | 
| align=left | 
|- align=center
| Win
| 23-5-1
| align=left |  Juan Valencia
| 
| 
| 
| align=left | 
| align=left | 
|- align=center
| Win
| 22-5-1
| align=left |  Gustavo Mendoza
| 
| 
| 
| align=left | 
| align=left | 
|- align=center
| Win
| 21-5-1
| align=left |  Antonio Arias
| 
| 
| 
| align=left | 
| align=left | 
|- align=center
| Win
| 20-5-1
| align=left |  Jose Luis Montes
| 
| 
| 
| align=left | 
| align=left | 
|- align=center
| Loss
| 19-5-1
| align=left |  Jose de Jesus Garcia
| 
| 
| 
| align=left | 
| align=left | 
|- align=center
| Loss
| 19-4-1
| align=left |  Jose Garcia
| 
| 
| 
| align=left | 
| align=left | 
|- align=center
| Loss
| 19-3-1
| align=left |  Martin Perez
| 
| 
| 
| align=left | 
| align=left | 
|- align=center
| Loss
| 19-2-1
| align=left |  Otilio Gallegos
| 
| 
| 
| align=left | 
| align=left | 
|- align=center
| Win
| 19-1-1
| align=left |  Tomas Valdez
| 
| 
| 
| align=left | 
| align=left | 
|- align=center
| Win
| 18-1-1
| align=left |  Carlos Monroy
| 
| 
| 
| align=left | 
| align=left | 
|- align=center
| Win
| 17-1-1
| align=left |  Otilio Gallegos
| 
| 
| 
| align=left | 
| align=left | 
|- align=center
| Loss
| 16-1-1
| align=left |  Raul Martinez Mora
| 
| 
| 
| align=left | 
| align=left | 
|- align=center
| Draw
| 16-0-1
| align=left |  Miguel Juarez
| 
| 
| 
| align=left | 
| align=left | 
|- align=center
| Win
| 16-0
| align=left |  Jose Davila
| 
| 
| 
| align=left | 
| align=left | 
|- align=center
| Win
| 15-0
| align=left |  Alfonso Salinas
| 
| 
| 
| align=left | 
| align=left | 
|- align=center
| Win
| 14-0
| align=left |  Gustavo Dominguez
| 
| 
| 
| align=left | 
| align=left | 
|- align=center
| Win
| 13-0
| align=left |  Benjamin Aragon
| 
| 
| 
| align=left | 
| align=left | 
|- align=center
| Win
| 12-0
| align=left |  Alvaro Medel
| 
| 
| 
| align=left | 
| align=left | 
|- align=center
| Win
| 11-0
| align=left |  David Navarro
| 
| 
| 
| align=left | 
| align=left | 
|- align=center
| Win
| 10-0
| align=left |  Rafael Valdovinos
| 
| 
| 
| align=left | 
| align=left | 
|- align=center
| Win
| 9-0
| align=left |  Juan Arias
| 
| 
| 
| align=left | 
| align=left | 
|- align=center
| Win
| 8-0
| align=left |  Rodolfo Peralta
| 
| 
| 
| align=left | 
| align=left | 
|- align=center
| Win
| 7-0
| align=left |  Ricardo Padilla
| 
| 
| 
| align=left | 
| align=left | 
|- align=center
| Win
| 6-0
| align=left |  Antonio Martinez
| 
| 
| 
| align=left | 
| align=left | 
|- align=center
| Win
| 5-0
| align=left |  Antonio Martinez
| 
| 
| 
| align=left | 
| align=left | 
|- align=center
| Win
| 4-0
| align=left |  Leoncio Rodriguez
| 
| 
| 
| align=left | 
| align=left | 
|- align=center
| Win
| 3-0
| align=left |  Antonio Martinez
| 
| 
| 
| align=left | 
| align=left | 
|- align=center
| Win
| 2-0
| align=left |  Carlos Navarro
| 
| 
| 
| align=left | 
| align=left | 
|- align=center
| Win
| 1-0
| align=left |  Alejandro Ochoa
| 
| 
| 
| align=left | 
| align=left |

See also
List of IBF world champions
List of Mexican boxing world champions

References

External links 
 

1973 births
International Boxing Federation champions
2013 deaths
Boxers from Jalisco
Sportspeople from Guadalajara, Jalisco
Welterweight boxers
Mexican male boxers
20th-century Mexican people
21st-century Mexican people